This article is an index of settings used in the plays of William Shakespeare.

Contents: A | B | C | D | E | F | G | H | I | J | K | L | M | N | O | P | Q | R | S | T | U | V | W | Y |


A
 Actium, a promontory in Greece. "Our overplus of shipping will we burn//And, with the rest full-mann'd//from the head of Actium//Beat the approaching Caesar" Antony and Cleopatra, III.VII.
 Agincourt The site of the defeat of the French by the heavily outnumbered English army in Henry V and the location of the St Crispin's Day speech. "Then call we this the field of Agincourt,/Fought on the day of Crispin Crispianus". 
 Alexandria and Rome are the two main settings of the tragedy Antony and Cleopatra.
 Angiers
 Anjou
 Antioch is the opening setting of the play Pericles, Prince of Tyre where the eponymous hero meets King Antiochus and his daughter then evades death after solving the riddle that points to their incestuous relationship.
 Antium
 Athens
 Auvergne

B
 Bangor, Wales was the setting for scene I of William Shakespeare's Henry IV, Part 1.
 Barnet
 Baynard's Castle
 The hospital of Bedlam is mentioned in "Pat!—he comes, like the catastrophe of the old comedy//my cue//is villainous melancholy, with a sigh like Tom o' Bedlam" King Lear, 1.2. 
 Belmont, the home of Portia in The Merchant of Venice. Its present-day location has been much debated.
 Birnam Wood appears in: "Macbeth shall never vanquished be until // Great Birnam wood to high Dunsinane hill // Shall come against him." Macbeth, 4.1.
 Blackfriars
 Blackheath
 Bohemia
 Bordeaux
 Bosworth; The Battle of Bosworth Field is the climax of Richard III. On the eve of the battle, the king is haunted by the ghosts of his many victims.
 Bury St Edmunds

C
 Canon Street is the setting for Act 4, scene VI of the play Henry VI, Part 2.
 Corioli
 The plays that William Shakespeare saw in Coventry during his boyhood or 'teens' may have influenced how his plays, such as Hamlet, came about.
 Cyprus and Venice are the two main settings for Othello. Cyprus was formally annexed by Venice in 1489, and remained part of the Venetian Empire until 1570. The play was written in 1603.
 "Cataian" (i.e. Cathay) a demonym often associated with China.

D
 Dover
 Dunsinane in Macbeth

E
 Eastcheap Hal and Falstaff frequent The Boar's Head Tavern on Eastcheap in Henry IV Part One.
 Egypt
 Elsinore
 Ely House is the London residence of John of Gaunt, father of Henry IV, and the place where he gives the famous "This England" speech before dying.
 Ephesus

F
 Fife in Macbeth
 Florence
 Forres in Macbeth
 Forest of Arden
 Frogmore

G
 Gadshill
 Gascony
 Gaultree Forest was referred to in Shakespeare's play Henry IV, Part 2.
 Gloucestershire

H
 Harfleur
 Houses of Parliament

I
 Illyria is a region in western Balkan Peninsula where Shakespeare's most famous fictional comedy, Twelfth Night takes place. It is also mentioned in the Part 2 of Henry VI: "Being captain of a pinnace, threatens more // Than Bargulus the strong Illyrian pirate."
 Inverness in Macbeth

J
 Jerusalem Chamber appeared in scene IV of Shakespare's Henry IV, Part 2. The king is taken there to die to compensate for the fact he never made his promised crusade to Jerusalem itself.

K
 Shakespeare used the tale of Henry V receiving the insulting gift of tennis balls from the French Dauphin at Kenilworth for dramatic effect in Henry V, Act 1, scene 2.
 Kent
 Kimbolton

L
 Leicestershire
 London
 Located in Cannon Street, the London Stone is an ancient stone of mythic origin that is bound up with London's fortunes. It was used as a place for proclamations to be read aloud to citizens of London. In Henry VI, Part 2, the rebel leader Jack Cade strikes his staff upon the stone and declares himself the new leader of the city; "And here, sitting/ upon London-stone, I charge and command that, of the/ city's cost, the pissing-conduit run nothing but/claret wine this first year of our reign."

M
 Mantua
 Margate
 Marseilles
 Messina
 Middleham Castle
 Milan
 Milford Haven is the Welsh port which Innogen travels to in Cymbeline in the belief that her husband Posthumus will meet her when, in fact, he has sent her to be murdered by Pisanio following Iachimo's lies about her fidelity to Posthumus. It is near Milford Haven that she is unknowingly reunited with her lost brothers, Guiderius and Arviragus, while disguised as a boy, Fidele.
 Misenum
 Mortimer's Cross

N
 Navarre
 Northampton Castle Is the location of the death of Prince Arthur in King John.

O
 Orléans

P
 Padua
 Paris
 Pentapolis is where Pericles meets and marries Thaisa, the daughter of King Simonides.
 Philippi
 Picardy
 Pomfret Castle

R
 Rochester
 Rome
 Rouen
 Roussillon

S
 Salisbury. Earl of Salisbury appears as a faithful lord to King Richard in the play Richard II. The character appears in the act II scene IV and act III scene II.
 Sandal Castle
 Sardis
 Savoy Palace. The former home of John of Gaunt, attacked by Jack Cade's rebels in Henry VI, Part 2: "So, sirs: now go some and pull down the Savoy;/ others to the inns of court; down with them all."
 Shrewsbury
 Sicily
 Southampton
 Southwark
 St Albans
 Swinstead Abbey was an abbey in Lincolnshire. In King John, the orchard is the scene of the death agonies of King John, supported by his Barons. In the actual history, it is Swineshead Abbey that King John visited, and the confusion of Swinstead and Swineshead was common in the late-sixteenth century.
 Syria

T
 Tamworth
 Tarsus
 Temple Garden This is the location in which red and white roses are picked to represent the houses of Lancaster and York in Henry VI Part 1
 Tewkesbury; The Battle of Tewkesbury is referenced in "We are advertis'd by our loving friends//That they do hold their course toward Tewkesbury." King Henry VI, Part 3, 5.3. The battle is also mentioned several times in Richard III.
 Thebes
 Tower of London Most notably, the Tower is the location of the murder of young Edward V and his brother, Richard, Duke of York, on the orders of their uncle Richard III.
 Towton/Saxton
 Troy is the hometown of the main characters in the Shakespearean tragedy Troilus and Cressida.
 Tyre

V
 Venice
 Verona
 Vienna

W
 Wakefield
 Wales
 Warkworth Castle
 Westminster
 Westminster Abbey
 Westminster Palace Westminster Hall, the last remaining building of the old palace, is the site of the powerful and controversial deposition scene in Richard II (play) where Richard hands his crown to his cousin, Henry Bolingbroke (Henry IV). "My crown I am; but still my griefs are mine:/You may my glories and my state depose,/But not my griefs; still am I king of those". Part of the Richard II segment of Shakespeare's Globe's Complete Walk to celebrate the 400th anniversary of Shakespeare's death was filmed in the Hall.
 Windsor

Y
 York
 York Place

References

Settings
Lists of places